Arnold Otwani (born 19 September 1995) is a Ugandan cricketer. He played one List A match in December 2010 for Uganda, during their tour of Kenya. He played for Uganda in the 2017 ICC World Cricket League Division Three tournament in May 2017.

In October 2018, he was named in Uganda's squad for the 2018 ICC World Cricket League Division Three tournament in Oman. He was the leading run-scorer for Uganda in the tournament, with 151 runs in five matches.

In May 2019, he was named in Uganda's squad for the Regional Finals of the 2018–19 ICC T20 World Cup Africa Qualifier tournament in Uganda. He made his Twenty20 International (T20I) debut for Uganda against Botswana on 20 May 2019. In July 2019, he was one of twenty-five players named in the Ugandan training squad, ahead of the Cricket World Cup Challenge League fixtures in Hong Kong. In November 2019, he was named in Uganda's squad for the Cricket World Cup Challenge League B tournament in Oman.

In April 2021, Otwani was named the captain of Uganda's T20I squad for their series against Namibia. After the 2022 Jersey Cricket World Cup Challenge League B tournament, Otwani and his teammate Frank Akankwasa chose to remain in the United Kingdom, making themselves unavailable for national selection.

References

External links
 

1995 births
Living people
Ugandan cricketers
Uganda Twenty20 International cricketers
Place of birth missing (living people)